American actor and filmmaker Ben Affleck has received many awards and honors throughout his career. He is the recipient of two Academy Awards, three Golden Globe Awards, two BAFTA Awards, and two Screen Actors Guild Awards. Affleck first gained recognition as a screenwriter for co-writing Good Will Hunting (1997) with Matt Damon, winning both the Academy Award for Best Original Screenplay and the Golden Globe Award for Best Screenplay. As an actor, he garnered a Golden Globe nomination and the Best Actor Award at the Venice Film Festival for his performance in Hollywoodland (2006). The film Argo (2012), which he directed, produced, and starred in, earned considerable acclaim and numerous accolades including the Golden Globe Award for Best Director, BAFTA Award for Best Direction, and Directors Guild of America Award for Outstanding Directing – Feature Film, as well as the Academy Award for Best Picture, BAFTA Award for Best Film, and Golden Globe Award for Best Motion Picture – Drama.

Beginning his career as a child actor, Affleck starred in the PBS educational series The Voyage of the Mimi in 1984 and its sequel in 1988. Following a brief appearance in the coming-of-age film Dazed and Confused (1993), he was cast in his first lead role in the romantic comedy-drama Chasing Amy (1997). The film Good Will Hunting, co-starring and co-written by Affleck and Damon, was released in 1997 to widespread acclaim and won the Golden Globe and Academy Award for Best Original Screenplay. At the age of 25, Affleck became the youngest writer to ever win an Oscar for screenwriting.

Affleck next appeared in a wide range of studio films including the disaster film Armageddon (1998), the period film Shakespeare in Love (1998), the war drama Pearl Harbor (2001), and the thriller film Changing Lanes (2002). In 2003, he suffered a career downturn marked by tabloid notoriety and a string of critical flops and Razzie Awards winners, such as the superhero film Daredevil and the  romantic comedy crime film Gigli. He returned to prominence in 2006 with his performance as the former Superman actor George Reeves in the mystery film Hollywoodland. The following year Affleck directed his first feature film, Gone Baby Gone. The neo-noir drama, starring his brother Casey Affleck, received critical praise and various accolades for Best Directorial Debut. His reputation as a filmmaker continued to grow with his subsequent efforts, the crime drama The Town (2010) and the historical drama Argo. In 2014 he starred in the psychological thriller Gone Girl, before taking on the role of Batman in the DC Extended Universe in 2016. Later that year he directed, wrote, and starred in the gangster film Live by Night.

Major industry awards

Academy Awards
The Academy Awards, also known as The Oscars, is a set of awards given annually by the Academy of Motion Picture Arts and Sciences to recognize excellence in cinematic achievements.

British Academy Film Awards
The British Academy Film Awards or BAFTA Film Awards are given annually by the British Academy of Film and Television Arts to reward outstanding contributions to British and international film.

Golden Globe Awards
The Golden Globe Awards are accolades bestowed by the Hollywood Foreign Press Association to recognize distinguished achievements in film and television.

Primetime Emmy Awards
The Primetime Emmy Award is presented by the Academy of Television Arts & Sciences in recognition of excellence in American primetime television programming.

Guild awards

Directors Guild of America Awards
The Directors Guild of America Award is given annually by the Directors Guild of America to honor directors for their directorial achievement in film and television.

Producers Guild of America Awards
The Producers Guild of America Award is given annually by the Producers Guild of America to honor the finest producing work in film and television.

Screen Actors Guild Awards
The Screen Actors Guild Award (also known as the SAG Award) is presented annually by the Screen Actors Guild‐American Federation of Television and Radio Artists to honor outstanding performers in film and television.

Writers Guild of America Awards
The Writers Guild of America Award is given annually by the Writers Guild of America, East and Writers Guild of America, West for outstanding achievements in film, television and media writing.

Film festivals' awards

Amanda Award
Established in 1985, the Amanda Award is an award given annually at the Norwegian International Film Festival in Haugesund, Norway.

Palm Springs International Film Festival
Founded in 1989, the Palm Springs International Film Festival is a film festival held annually in Palm Springs, California.

Santa Barbara International Film Festival
Founded in 1986, the Santa Barbara International Film Festival is a film festival held annually in Santa Barbara, California.

Toronto International Film Festival
The Toronto International Film Festival (TIFF) is held annually in Toronto as one of the largest film festivals in the world.

Venice Film Festival
The Venice Film Festival or Venice International Film Festival is the oldest film festival in the world. It was founded in 1932 and held annually in Venice.

Other awards and nominations

American Film Institute Awards
The American Film Institute Awards is presented annually by American Film Institute to honors 10 outstanding films and 10 outstanding television programs of the year.

AACTA International Awards
The AACTA International Awards are presented annually by the Australian Academy of Cinema and Television Arts (AACTA) to recognize film excellence, regardless of geography.

César Awards
The César Award is the national film award of France supported by the French Ministry of Culture. First awarded in 1976, it is the French equivalent of the Academy Award in the United States.

Golden Raspberry Awards
Co-founded by UCLA film graduates and industry veterans John J. B. Wilson and Mo Murphy, the Golden Raspberry Awards (also known as Razzies and Razzie Awards) is an award saluting the worst that Hollywood has to offer each year.

Hollywood Film Awards
The Hollywood Film Awards is an American film award ceremony held annually to recognize excellence in the art of cinema and filmmaking.

Humanitas Prize
Founded in 1974, the Humanitas Prize is a prize awarded to film and television writers whose work "affirm the dignity of the human person, probe the meaning of life and enlighten the use of human freedom."

Irish Film & Television Awards
The Irish Film & Television Awards are presented annually by the Irish Film & Television Academy to honor the best in films and television.

Kids' Choice Awards
The Kids' Choice Awards is an annual awards show that airs on the Nickelodeon cable channel to honor its viewers' favorite television, film and music acts of the year.

MTV Movie & TV Awards
The MTV Movie & TV Awards is presented annually on MTV to honor the best in film and television, as chosen by a national poll of MTV viewers.

National Board of Review
Founded in 1909, the National Board of Review honors outstanding cinema as both art and entertainment.

People's Choice Awards
The People's Choice Awards is an annual American awards show recognizing the people and the work of popular culture, as voted by the general public.

Robert Awards
The Robert Award is a Danish film prize awarded each year by the Danish Film Academy since 1984.

Satellite Awards
The Satellite Awards are presented annually by the International Press Academy to honor excellence in the areas of Motion Pictures, Television, Radio, and New Media.

Saturn Awards
The Saturn Award is an award presented annually by the Academy of Science Fiction, Fantasy and Horror Films; its initial focus was to honor and recognize the genres of science fiction, fantasy and horror films, but has since grown to include additional genres, as well as television and home media releases.

Teen Choice Awards
The Teen Choice Awards is an annual awards show that airs on Fox to honor its teen viewers' favorite acts in movies, TV, and music.

Various critics' awards

See also
Ben Affleck filmography

Footnotes

References

Awards and nominations
Lists of awards received by American actor
Lists of awards received by film director
Lists of awards received by writer